This is a list of Japanese football J1 League transfers in the winter transfer window 2015–16 by club.

Source:

Sanfrecce Hiroshima 

In:

Out:

Urawa Red Diamonds 

In:

Out:

Gamba Osaka 

In:

Out:

FC Tokyo 

In:

Out:

Kashima Antlers 

In:

Out:

Kawasaki Frontale 

In:

Out:

Yokohama F. Marinos 

In:

Out:

Shonan Bellmare 

In:

Out:

Nagoya Grampus 

In:

Out:

Kashiwa Reysol 

In:

Out:

Sagan Tosu 

In:

Out:

Vissel Kobe 

In:

Out:

Ventforet Kofu 

In:

Out:

Vegalta Sendai 

In:

Out:

Albirex Niigata 

In:

Out:

Omiya Ardija 

In:

Out:

Jùbilo Iwata 

In:

Out:

Avispa Fukuoka 

In:

Out:

References 

2015-16
Transfers
Japan